Lalo is a masculine given name. Notable people with this given name include:

 Lalo Hartich (1904–1979), Argentine actor
 Lalo Mir, Argentine radio host
 Lalo Ríos (1927–1973), Mexican-born American actor
 Lalo Barrubia, Uruguayan writer, performer and translator María del Rosario González (born 1967)
 Lalo Rodríguez, stage name of Puerto Rican salsa singer and musician Ubaldo Rodríguez Santos (born 1958)

See also

Masculine given names